Mola (previously Mola TV) is an Indonesian subscription video on-demand and over-the-top streaming service. Mola is owned and operated by Djarum Group's subsidiary Polytron and is headquartered in Jakarta. 

Mola holds live and on-demand broadcasting rights for multiple sports competitions, including the Premier League in Indonesia and Timor Leste. Mola also offers on-demand streaming from a library of films and television series, including some original programming.

History 
In October 2018, Mola acquired broadcasting rights for the Premier League in Indonesia and Timor-Leste up to 2022. The rights were previously held by beIN Sports.

Mola was officially launched on August 2, 2019. On September 2, Mola acquired broadcasting rights for the Football Association of Indonesia. This includes rights to the Indonesian senior and youth national football team, the national round of the Indonesian Liga 3, the Elite Pro Academy, the Soeratin Cup, and the Indonesian women's league Liga 1 Putri. On the same day, Mola also acquired a selection of FIFA rights (including the FIFA World Cup) and UEFA rights (including the UEFA Nations League and the 2020 UEFA European Football Championship).

On January 13, 2020, Mola acquired rights to the Bundesliga and the UEFA Youth League, taking over from Super Soccer TV. On March 27, 2020, Mola acquired rights to the WWE previously held by MNC Sports. This marks the return of WWE broadcasts in Indonesia after a two-year hiatus. In July 2020, Mola acquired rights from WarnerMedia Asia to carry select channels and films from HBO and Cartoon Network. In September 2020, Mola acquired rights to the National Football League.

On January 5, 2021, Mola announced that it has brought on board Ching Ping Lee as its Chief Technology Officer.

On June 16, 2021, Mola worked with Huawei to bring the Mola app to the Huawei App Gallery.

In June 2021, Mola started streaming in 4K with the European Cup matches, for the first time in Jakarta.

On October 15, 2021, Mola has officially announced their operational expansion in Europe & Southeast Asia with the same value as the Indonesian version. The streaming service would expect to go live in UK, Italy, Singapore and Malaysia starting October 29, 2021; which featured some of their original programming (including their Mola Chill Fridays concert series) along with some sporting events which Mola has been carried in Indonesia. They had previously brought the license from recently closed Fox Sports Asia for airing the entire UFC libraries, including the currently aired Dana White's Contender Series, into the platform for Singapore, Malaysia and Indonesia.

Mola is also the main sponsor of Como 1907, in which Djarum Group was the owner of both the streaming platform and the club.

Programming

Sports 
Mola Sports offers live and on-demand streaming for many sports competitions. This includes live coverage, on-demand live replays, and supplementary content such as highlights.

Current sports rights 

Association football
 Garuda Select
 EFL Cup
 English Football League: Only in Singapore and Malaysia
 Bundesliga
 DFL-Supercup
 Serie B: Sub-license in UK, Singapore and Malaysia
 Serie A Femminile
 Eredivisie: Sub-license in Singapore, UK and Italy
 KNVB Beker
 Johan Cruyff Shield
 Belgian First Division A: Sub-license in UK, Singapore and Malaysia
 Super League Greece: Italy only
 Primeira Liga
 Copa Libertadores
 Copa Sudamericana
 Recopa Sudamericana
American Football
 National Football League: Sub-license in Singapore and Malaysia
Motorsport
 NASCAR Cup Series: Indonesia, Singapore and Italy only
 Deutsche Tourenwagen Masters
 World Rally Championship
 Dakar Rally
 Supercars Championship
Boxing
 Frank Warren Boxing: Sub-license in Singapore and Malaysia
 BOXXER: Sub-licensed in Singapore and Malaysia
Athletics
Valencia Marathon
Golf
 Ryder Cup
 LPGA Tour
 PGA Tour
 PGA Tour Champions
 European Tour
 Women's Amateur Asia-Pacific
 LIV Golf
Ice Hockey
 National Hockey League 
Professional Wrestling
 World Wrestling Entertainment: Exclusive live broadcasts of Raw and SmackDown events.
Mixed Martial Arts
 Ultimate Fighting Championship: Sub-license in Singapore and Malaysia.
 Cage Warriors
 Bellator MMA: Singapore and Malaysia only
 Professional Fighters League
Rugby
 Premiership Rugby: Italy only

Former sports rights 

Association football
 Chinese Super League
 Ekstraklasa
 International Champions Cup
 UEFA Youth League
 UEFA Euro 2020
 CONCACAF Gold Cup
 2022 FIFA World Cup qualification (AFC, UEFA, CONMEBOL & CAF)
 Premier League
 UEFA Nations League
 European Qualifiers
 DFB-Pokal
Basketball
 EuroLeague
Badminton
 Badminton Asia Championships
 PBSI Home Tournament
Motorsport
 FIM CEV Moto3 Junior World Championship
 FIM CEV Moto2 European Championship
 Formula E
 Superbike World Championship
Tennis
 Davis Cup (2019)

Movies and Series 
Mola offers a selections of movies and series consisting of both local and foreign titles. It featured titles from foreign studios such as All3Media, Banijay, BBC Studios, Entertainment One, Fremantle, ITV Studios, Keshet International, Lionsgate (including Starz), MGM, Paramount (including Paramount Pictures and CBS Studios, which also carried Paramount+ and Showtime titles), StudioCanal, Sony Pictures, etc. They even produce original titles such as sports docu-series Dream Chasers: Garuda Select and Como 1907: The Real Story.

Living 
Mola offers a variety of both local and foreign lifestyle content. Most of them which was their Mola Chill Fridays concert series, which featured performance from Simple Plan, Keane, Jorja Smith, Honne, Kodaline, Aurora, LANY, King Princess, Charlie Puth, etc; along with Mola Living Live, which featured exclusive interview with some of the well-known names such as Dana White, Alec Baldwin, Michael Douglas, John Travolta, Mike Tyson, etc.

Kids 
Mola offers a library of children's programming. They featured content from the pre-school age to the younger kids, along with original content for family audiences, such as their interactive family musical Sofa Kuning.

Notes

References

External links 
 


2019 establishments in Indonesia
Mass media companies of Indonesia
Sports television in Indonesia
Indonesian entertainment websites
Subscription video on demand services
Video on demand services